Deep Hearted is the debut album of the hip hop group Strong Arm Steady. It was released on August 28, 2007 under Nature Sounds.

Track listing

References

2007 debut albums
Nature Sounds albums
Strong Arm Steady albums
Albums produced by Madlib